Newton Valence is a village and civil parish in the East Hampshire district of Hampshire, England. It is 4.4 miles (7.1 km) south of Alton, just off the A32 road.

The nearest railway station is Liss, 4.5 miles (7.3 km) southeast of the village, although the station at Alton is a similar distance to the north.

The village sits high in the westernmost chalk hills of the South Downs: maximum elevation 191 metres (627 feet) above sea level. Much of the surrounding landscape is within the East Hampshire Area of Outstanding Natural Beauty.

Farming is the most obvious economic activity. Arable farming (mainly wheat, maize and oil-seed rape) and sheep-grazing predominate.

The church and grounds

The Anglican church of St Mary's was restored in 1871 and is faced in flint. The nave and chancel are early English, about 1300; the west tower is also early English, but has an embattled top, made of brick and dated to 1812. There are five bells in the tower, the largest weighing nine hundredweight (approximately 458 kilogrammes). The tower's black-faced clock was restored as a Millennium Project. There are two piscinas and a large Norman font.

Charles Wilson, 1st Baron Moran, Sir Winston Churchill's personal physician, is buried in the churchyard.

The yew tree next to the church is one of the most venerable in the district now that the famous yew at Selborne Church has died. Its age has been estimated at about 1,000 years.

Adjoining the churchyard is the Manor House (17th–18th Century), now divided into two dwellings. The older portion has two storeys of coursed stone blocks with brick dressings, plinth and band, and a long ridge slate roof. There is a red brick Georgian portion, with parapet and hipped tile roof. The Victorian wing, of yellow brick, is of two storeys with a low pitched slate roof and sash windows.

Opposite the driveway to the church is a dew pond which was repuddled in the 1990s. Nearby, on a triangle of grass between Newton Lane and the track to Selborne Common, is a small sarsen stone.

Amenities
The village has a Sports and Social Centre (half of the Victorian school; the other half has been converted to a dwelling), but no shops or public house.

Prehistoric settlement
Known traces of prehistoric settlement are:

 A Bronze Age bowl barrow: 36 metres in diameter and 1.8 metres high (north-east of Lodge Farm; damaged by ploughing)
 An Iron Age field system: at the southern edge of Goldridge Plantation, comprising a series of three contour lynchets extending for nearly 1.6 km.

Enclosure

The enclosure of the commons and common fields of Newton Valence was authorised in 1848 in the Second Enclosure Act of that year along with fifteen other disparate places, with only Greatham also in Hampshire. It was further evidence of a government and landowners’ conveyor belt. The enclosure business was now such that a local professional land surveyor
and valuer was employed. Richard Wakefield Attree of Bishearne in the parish of Liss produced a rapid, but competent, report allotting almost 150 acres among nine groups consisting of eleven people with a further six acres specified for roads and a pond.  The connected Upper and Lower Commons were the centre of interest running half-way down what is now Mary Lane, including Common Barn Farm, and was then called Common Road. Three public carriage roads, twenty-six feet wide, were directed and laid out on the maps. The pond was to be a ‘public watering place’ at Upper Common on the Ropley and East Tisted border and marking a continuum of old commons all the way to Soldridge. The pond can be seen today at Headmore Farm on Headmore Lane in what was the furthest point in Newton Valence from the village centre. ‘Cleansing and repairs’ were allocated to Henry Chawner, the largest land recipient and lord of the manor by purchase. 

Chawner was one of five who received over 10 per cent of the Newton Valence commons, 53 acres, 27.7 per cent, in three lots, to add to his existing 517 acres. The others were Robert and Henry Knight, 21.6 per cent in three lots; Eli Turvill, 13.9 per cent; James Winter Scott, 11.4 per cent and Captain George Ourry Lempriere, 10.3 per cent. A further two fenced acres were allotted to the churchwardens and overseers of the poor in trust ‘as a place of exercise and recreation for the inhabitants … of the neighbourhood’. Attree’s two detailed maps survive.

Famous residents
Henry Chawner, freeman of the Goldsmiths’ Company of London, whose company, inherited from his father, Thomas, produced some of London’s finest silver
Thomas Dumaresq, British Admiral
Audley Lempriere, British Army officer 
George Ourry Lempriere, British Admiral
Rev. Thomas Snow, fourth son of banker George Snow and a leading member of a small group of Anglican discontents known collectively as the Western Schism, led by Sir Thomas Baring
Thomas D'Oyly Snow, British Army officer
Charles Wilson, 1st Baron Moran, physician - died at the home of his son in Newton Valence in 1978.
 Julian Charles Douglas Balaam ~ Aeronautical engineer. Born 9th October 1962 and raised Shoreham by Sea.

Further reading
Heal, Chris, Ropley's Legacy, The ridge enclosures, 1709 to 1850: Chawton, Farringdon, Medstead, Newton Valence and Ropley and the birth of Four Marks (Chattaway & Spottiswood, 2021)[7]

Munby, Julian, edited, Domesday Book, 4, Hampshire (1086; Phillimore, Chichester 1982)

Other information
The village features in Gilbert White's Natural History of Selborne. White's brother, John, used to live in Newton Valence. Gilbert would cross Selborne Common to visit him: a walk of about two miles, made easier in 1753 when they finished construction of the Zig-Zag path which, ascending from Selborne to the Common, is still in use today.

Within the parish boundary is Noar Hill, part of which is given over to a nature reserve noted for its flowers and butterflies.

References

External links

Villages in Hampshire